Armindo Fonseca (born 1 May 1989) is a French former racing cyclist, who rode professionally for the  team – through various team names – from 2011 to 2018. He competed in the Tour de France on three occasions – in 2014, 2015 and 2016.

Major results

2010
 9th Overall Kreiz Breizh Elites
2011
 2nd Tour du Finistère
2012
 4th Tour de Vendée
 7th Tour du Finistère
2013
 2nd Circuito de Getxo
 3rd Boucles de l'Aulne
 4th Grand Prix de la Ville de Lillers
 5th Overall Four Days of Dunkirk
 8th Grand Prix de Plumelec-Morbihan
2014
 1st Tour de Vendée
 3rd Tour du Finistère
 3rd Grand Prix de Plumelec-Morbihan
 4th Overall Tour du Haut Var
 5th Overall Boucles de la Mayenne
1st Stage 1
 5th La Drôme Classic
2015
 5th Grand Prix de Fourmies
 7th GP Ouest–France
 8th Grand Prix de Plumelec-Morbihan
 9th Duo Normand (with Benoît Jarrier)
2016
 5th Overall La Tropicale Amissa Bongo
 6th Route Adélie
 9th Cholet-Pays de Loire
 10th Tour du Finistère
2017
 4th Paris–Camembert
 6th Paris–Bourges
 9th Route Adélie
2018
 3rd Classic Loire-Atlantique
 8th Overall Ronde de l'Oise
 9th Cholet-Pays de la Loire

Grand Tour general classification results timeline

References

External links

1989 births
Living people
French male cyclists
Sportspeople from Rennes
21st-century French people